The 2010 European Juveniles Baseball Championship was an international baseball competition held in Hluboká nad Vltavou and Zliv, Czech Republic from July 13 to 17, 2010. It featured teams from Austria, Belarus, Czech Republic, Lithuania, Romania, Russia and Slovakia.

In the end, Russia ended the winning streak of Czech Republic by winning the tournament.

Schedule and results

Group stage

Pool A

Pool B

Final Round

Pool C

Semi-finals

3rd place

Final

Final standings

References

External links
Official Website
Game Results

European Juveniles Baseball Championship
European Juveniles Baseball Championship
International baseball competitions hosted by the Czech Republic
2010 in Czech sport